Dichrometra is a genus of echinoderms belonging to the family Mariametridae.

Species:

Dichrometra articulata 
Dichrometra austini 
Dichrometra bimaculata 
Dichrometra brachypecha 
Dichrometra ciliata 
Dichrometra doederleini 
Dichrometra flagellata 
Dichrometra grandis 
Dichrometra gyges 
Dichrometra palmata 
Dichrometra regalis 
Dichrometra stylifer 
Dichrometra tenuicirra

References

Mariametridae
Crinoid genera